Sandao "三嶋" in Chinese characters, which was also known as Sanyu (三嶼) or Sanshu (三洲), were a collection of a Prehispanic Filipino polities recorded in Chinese annals as a nation occupying the islands of Jamayan 加麻延 (present-day Calamian), Balaoyou 巴姥酉 (present-day Palawan), and Pulihuan 蒲裏喚 (near present-day Manila). In the Chinese Gazetteer the Zhufan zhi 諸蕃志 (1225), they were described as tributary states of the more powerful nation of Ma-i centered in nearby Mindoro.

They described Sandao as thus:

Sandao remained tributary states of Ma-i until its territories were invaded by Sulu and Brunei marking its end as an independent nation.

References

Former countries
Former countries in Philippine history
History of Palawan
History of Luzon
History of the Philippines (900–1565)